Stuhać is a demonic mythical creature in Serbian mythology, recorded in Herzegovina. Though its name is similar with zduhać, there is no actual similarity.

Stuhać lives in high mountains and barren areas; how it looks is not described, however, it is known that it wears clutters made of human ligaments on its legs, so that it would not slip on mountain precipices. If its clutter broke, he would pull ligaments from someone's legs to make new one.

References

Slavic demons
Serbian folklore